Giambattista Febei (1623 – 14 April 1688) was a Roman Catholic prelate who served as Bishop of Acquapendente (1683–1688).

Biography
Giambattista Febei was born in Orvieto, Italy in 1623 and ordained a priest on 11 July 1683. On 12 July 1683, he was appointed during the papacy of Pope Innocent XI as Bishop of Acquapendente. On 25 July 1683, he was consecrated bishop by Galeazzo Marescotti, Bishop of Tivoli, with Francesco Casati, Titular Archbishop of Trapezus, and Prospero Bottini, Titular Archbishop of Myra, serving as co-consecrators. He served as Bishop of Acquapendente until his death on 14 April 1688.

References

External links and additional sources
 (for Chronology of Bishops) 
 (for Chronology of Bishops)  

17th-century Italian Roman Catholic bishops
Bishops appointed by Pope Innocent XI
1623 births
1688 deaths